The Cui clan of Boling (博陵崔氏) was a notable Chinese clan of noble descent which was politically active from the Han dynasty to the end of the Five Dynasties and Ten Kingdoms period. They shared the same ancestry as the Cui clan of Qinghe. The founding father of this clan, Cui Zhongmou (崔仲牟), was a younger brother of Cui Ye (崔業), the founding father of the Cui clan of Qinghe. Their father, Jizi (季子), was the common ancestor of these two clans.

The Cui clan of Boling traditionally lived in Boling Commandery, which covered parts of present-day Hebei. Members of this clan served as officials in the government of the Han dynasty. Although there were many famous Confucian scholars from the Cui family, they did not have any significant political influence until the late Six Dynasties era.

During the Sui and Tang dynasties, the Cui clan of Boling became so influential that when Emperor Taizong of the Tang dynasty once asked a minister which was the most influential clan of that time, the minister replied that it was the Cui family of Boling. The emperor felt displeased because he thought that the Li family, the imperial family, should be the most prestigious one in his time. In total, there were 15 members from the Cui family of Boling who held the position of chancellor during the Tang dynasty, and one during the Five Dynasties and Ten Kingdoms period.

It is not known what happened to the Cui clan of Boling after the establishment of the Song dynasty as nothing was recorded about them in historical records. It is clear, however, that most of the notable Chinese clans suffered from the wars in the Five Dynasties and Ten Kingdoms era, and many of them were no longer mentioned in historical records again after that period.

Branches 
These were the branches of the Cui clan of Boling.

 Boling Anping branch (博陵安平房)
 Elder Boling branch (博陵大房)
 Second Boling branch (博陵第二房)
 Third Boling branch (博陵第三房)
 Fourth Boling branch (博陵第四房)
 Fifth Boling branch (博陵第五房)
 Sixth Boling branch (博陵第六房)

References 

 
Chinese clans